Ryan Matthew Burr (born May 28, 1994) is an American professional baseball pitcher in the Tampa Bay Rays organization. He made his Major League Baseball (MLB) debut with the Chicago White Sox in 2018.

Amateur career
Burr attended Highlands Ranch High School in Highlands Ranch, Colorado. The Texas Rangers selected Burr in the 33rd round of the 2012 Major League Baseball draft. He did not sign with the Rangers and attended Arizona State University, where he played college baseball for the Arizona State Sun Devils. He finished his career with a school record 38 career saves.

Professional career

Arizona Diamondbacks
After his junior year, Burr was drafted by the Arizona Diamondbacks in the fifth round of the 2015 MLB draft. He made his professional debut with the Hillsboro Hops and ended the year with the Kane County Cougars, posting a combined 4–1 record and 1.06 ERA in 34 innings pitched between both clubs. Burr returned to Kane County in 2016 and posted a 1–2 record and 3.86 ERA in only 23 innings pitched. He began 2017 with Kane County and was later promoted to the Visalia Rawhide.

Chicago White Sox
On August 11, 2017, the Chicago White Sox acquired Burr from Arizona for international signing bonus pool money. Chicago assigned him to the Winston-Salem Dash. In  total innings pitched between Kane County, Visalia, and Winston-Salem, Burr pitched to a 2–2 record, 1.65 ERA, and a 1.12 WHIP.

Burr began the 2018 season with the Birmingham Barons and was promoted to the Triple-A Charlotte Knights in late July, appearing in 7 games out of the bullpen and posting a 1.08 ERA over  innings pitched. He was promoted to the major leagues on August 22, 2018, and made his major league debut on August 24 out of the bullpen, retiring all four batters he faced and striking out two in the team's 7–2 loss to the Detroit Tigers. Burr underwent Tommy John surgery in June 2019 ending his 2019 season and causing him to miss a sizable portion of the 2020 season. Burr has non-tendered by Chicago on December 2, 2019, and became a free agent. On December 3, he re-signed with Chicago on a minor league contract. Burr did not play in a game in 2020 due to the cancellation of the minor league season because of the COVID-19 pandemic. He re-signed with Chicago on a new minor league deal on November 2, 2020.

On May 27, 2021, Burr was selected to the active roster. The White Sox released him on June 13, 2022.

Tampa Bay Rays
On August 30, 2022, Burr signed a minor league deal with the Tampa Bay Rays.

References

External links

Arizona State Sun Devils bio

1994 births
Living people
People from Highlands Ranch, Colorado
Baseball players from Colorado
Major League Baseball pitchers
Chicago White Sox players
Arizona State Sun Devils baseball players
Hillsboro Hops players
Kane County Cougars players
Visalia Rawhide players
Winston-Salem Dash players
Birmingham Barons players
Charlotte Knights players